"It's for You" is a song by Shanice and produced by Eric Kirkland and Michael Angelo Saulsberry of Portrait with drum programming by Maurice Thompson. It also features a rap verse from Brett Bouldin. The single was released from the soundtrack of the film The Meteor Man. It became another moderate hit for the singer. A music video was filmed. Shanice also performed the song on the Family Matters episode "Rock Enroll", which originally aired January 7, 1994.

Critical reception
Larry Flick from Billboard wrote that the song "places Shanice's crystalline voice inside a romantic pop/R&B shuffle tune." He added, "Complemented by Brett Bouldin's understated rap, singer strikes a more mature and soulful stance than on recent efforts. Tightly woven background harmonies create a soothing and dreamy mood. Top 40 and urban radio programmers have already begun to embrace this sparkling jewel of a single. A summery delight."

Track listing
12" single
A1. It's For You (LP Version)(drum programming by Maurice Thompson) (4:05)
A2. It's For You (Street Mix) (4:34)
A3. It's For You (Mike's Swazza Mix) (4:32)
B1. It's For You (Bassapella) (4:31)
B2. It's For You (LP Instrumental) (4:05)

Charts

Weekly charts

Year-end charts

References

1993 singles
Shanice songs
Songs written for films
Songs written by Shanice
1993 songs
Motown singles